The Swingin' Medallions are an American beach music group from Greenwood, South Carolina, United States.

History
The band was formed as The Medallions in 1962 adding the "Swingin'" in 1965; possibly as a tribute to the Swingin' Travelers, an R&B group popular in South Carolina in the late 1950s and early 1960s. In 1967, Brent Fortson and Steve Caldwell left the band and with six members of The Tassles out of North Carolina formed the Pieces of Eight. Johnny Cox and Hack Bartley replaced the two at saxophones.

Their first single, "I Wanna Be Your Guy", was inadvertently released under the name, "Swinging Medallions" instead of "Swingin' Medallions". It did not chart, but the second, "Double Shot (Of My Baby's Love)", written by Don Smith and Cyril Vetter and  originally recorded by Dick Holler and the Holidays, reached No. 17 in the U.S. Billboard Hot 100 in 1966, and propelled their album to No. 88 on the Billboard 200. It was recorded at the Arthur Smith Studios in Charlotte, North Carolina. WIST radio jock Tom Gauger was called in to re-mix for release on Smash. The follow-up single "She Drives Me Out of My Mind", hit No. 71, but the next single, "Hey, Hey, Baby", did not chart. The band continued to be popular in the American South.

In the early-1960s, they frequently played at the Oporto Armory in Birmingham, Alabama where their songs got national airplay by Dave Roddy on WSGN. The band was also a popular attraction in Panama City Beach, Myrtle Beach, and Auburn University.

The band (with a shifting cast) continued to do reunion shows into the 2000s. On September 16, 2009, the band joined Bruce Springsteen & the E Street Band during their concert at the Bi-Lo Center in Greenville, South Carolina for a performance of "Double Shot (Of My Baby's Love)".

One alumnus of the group, drummer Michael Huey, went on to become the staff drummer for the Bill Lowery Studios in Atlanta playing on hit records for the Winstons, Sami Jo, Johnny Nash, Joe South, Frankie Miller, Allen Toussaint, and others. Huey moved to Los Angeles in 1976 and played on numerous hit records and tours with Walter Egan ("Magnet and Steel"), Juice Newton, Glenn Frey, Joe Walsh, Etta James, Lindsey Buckingham, Michael Martin Murphey, Johnny Lee, and the Miami Vice television series, among others. Another alumnus, actor Grainger Hines, was with the group between 1968 and 1971.

John McElrath (born John Grady McElrath in Greenwood County, South Carolina on April 13, 1941) died of Parkinson's disease on June 9, 2018, at age 77.  Jimbo Doares (born James Woodrow Doares, Jr. in Columbia, South Carolina on August 14, 1944) died on September 7, 2022, at age 78.

Original members
John McElrath - keyboards 
Jimbo Doares - guitar 
Carroll Bledsoe - trumpet
Charles Webber - trumpet
Fredie Pugh, saxophone
Brent Forston - saxophone, flute
Jimmy Perkins - bass guitar
Joe Morris - drums
Perrin Gleaton - lead guitar
Roy Davenport - guitar, vocals

Discography
Albums
 Double Shot (Of My Baby's Love) (Smash/Mercury MGS-27083/SRS-67083, 1966)
 Sun Sand and Sea (4 Sale DRP-7775, 1981)
 It's All Right
 Get U Some (USB Records, 1993)
 Original Coors Beach Party No. 1 (Medallion, 1998)
 Original Coors Beach Party No. 2 (Medallion, 2000)
 Christmas Party (2001)
 Round & Round (2003) (as Three Medallions) 
 Generations (2004)

Compilations
 Anthology (Ripete 5145, 1997)

Singles
 "Bye Bye, Silly Girl"/"I Want To Be Your Guy" (Dot 16721, 1965)
 "Double Shot (Of My Baby's Love)"/"Here It Comes Again" (4 Sale 002, 1965)
 "Double Shot (Of My Baby's Love)"/"Here It Comes Again" (Smash 2033, 1966)
 "She Drives Me Out Of My Mind"/"You Gotta Have Faith" (Smash 2050, 1966)
 "I Don't Want To Lose You Baby"/"Night Owl" (Smash 2075, 1966)
 "I Found A Rainbow"/"Don't Cry No More" (Smash 2084, 1967)
 "Turn On The Music"/"Summer's Not The Same This Year" (Smash 2107, 1967)
 "Where Can I Go To Get Soul"/"Bow And Arrow" (Smash 2129, 1967)
 "Hey, Hey, Baby"/"Sun, Sand, And Sea" (Capitol 2338, 1968)
 "We're Gonna Hate Ourselves In The Morning"/"It's Alright (You're Just In Love)" (123 Records 1723, 1970)
 "Rollin' Rovin' River"/"Don't Let Your Feet Touch The Ground" (123 Records 1732, 1970)
 "I'm Gonna Make Her Mine"/"Barefootin'" (EBS 062085, 197?)

Reissue Singles

 "Baby Talk" (Jan and Dean)/"Double Shot Of My Baby's Love" (Collectables 3102)
 "Mendocino" (Sir Douglas Quintet)/"Double Shot (Of My Baby's Love)" (Smash 1421)
 "Polk Salad Annie" (Tony Joe White)/"Double Shot (Of My Baby's Love)" (Ripete 128)
 "She Drives Me Out Of My Mind"/"Hey Hey Baby" (Ripete 143)

References

External links
Official website

Musical groups from South Carolina
Musical groups established in 1962
American pop music groups
1962 establishments in South Carolina